William Ainslie Scott (1845 – 17 June 1899) was an English cricketer active in 1874 who played for Lancashire. He died in Bolton. He appeared in one first-class match, scoring 14 runs with a highest score of 9.

Notes

1845 births
1899 deaths
English cricketers
Lancashire cricketers